The list of states and union territories of the Republic of India by area is ordered from largest to smallest according to the census of 2011. India consists of 28 states and eight union territories, including the National Capital Territory of Delhi.

List of states by area 

Source:Area of states

In August 2019, the Indian Parliament passed a resolution to divide the state of Jammu and Kashmir into two Union Territories, Jammu & Kashmir (J&K) and Ladakh, which came into action on 31 October 2019.

See also 
 List of political and geographic subdivisions by total area
 List of states and union territories of India by population
 States and union territories of India

Notes

References 

India,area